Ismail Hossain Talukder is a Bangladesh Muslim League politician and the former Member of Parliament of Mymensingh-2.

Career
Talukder was elected to parliament from Mymensingh-2 as a Bangladesh Muslim League candidate in 1979.

References

Bangladesh Muslim League politicians
Living people
2nd Jatiya Sangsad members
Year of birth missing (living people)